The 2008–09 season will be Debreceni VSC - TEVA's 16th competitive season, 16th consecutive season in the Soproni Liga and 106th year in existence as a football club.

Team kit
The team kits for the 2008-09 season are produced by Adidas and the shirt sponsor is TEVA and Ave-Ásványvíz. The home kit is red colour and the away kit is white colour.

Squad

First-team squad

Statistics

Appearances and goals
Last updated on 30 May 2009.

|}

Top scorers
Includes all competitive matches. The list is sorted by shirt number when total goals are equal.

Last updated on 30 May 2009

Disciplinary record 
Includes all competitive matches. Players with 1 card or more included only.

Last updated on 30 May 2009

Soproni Liga

Classification

Results summary

Results by round

Matches

Autumn

Debreceni VSC: Csernyánszki - Bernáth, Komlósi, Leandro, N. Mészáros (Z. Varga 62.), Z. Takács - Czvitkovics, Huszák (Dombi 46.), Z. Kiss - Zs. Kerekes (L. Oláh 57.), Rudolf. Coach: András Herczeg.
Zalaegerszegi TE: Vlaszák - Botis, Kocsárdi, P. Máté, Miljatovic, Szamosi - Alomerovic (Petneházi 68.), Z. Tóth, Trnavac (N. Hajdú 46.) - Meye (Pekic 76.), Waltner. Coach: Attila Supka.
G.: Rudolf (38. - pen, 66.) – Waltner (21. - pen)
Y.: Bernáth (69.), Czvitkovics (76.) – Trnavac (38.), Waltner (51.)

Győri ETO FC: Stevanovic - Nikolov, Supic, Völgyi - Bank, Bicak, Jäkl (Csermelyi 58.), Józsi, Koltai (Tokody 46.) - Brnovic (Pákolicz 46.), Z. I. Kovács. Coach: Sándor Egervári.
Debreceni VSC: Poleksic - Leandro, N. Mészáros, Z. Nagy (Zs. Kerekes 89.), I. Szűcs, Z. Takács - Czvitkovics, Demjén (Dombi 75.), Z. Kiss - L. Oláh (P. Szakály 65.), Rudolf. Coach: András Herczeg.
G.: L. Oláh (23.), I. Szűcs (29., 42.)
Y.: Nikolov (61.)
R.: Völgyi (79.)

Debreceni VSC: Poleksic - Bernáth, P. Bíró, Leandro, N. Mészáros, Z. Takács - Czvitkovics (P. Szakály 71.), Demjén, Z. Kiss - L. Oláh (Dombi 68.), Rudolf (Z. Varga 90.). Coach: András Herczeg.
FC Fehérvár: Zs. Sebők - Andic, G. Horváth, Koller, Mohl - Dvéri (D. Nagy 46.), B. Farkas, Pavlicic (Simek 79.), Sifter (Romero 65.) - Sitku, G. Vujovic. Coach: László Disztl.
G.: L. Oláh (32.)
Y.: Czvitkovics (52.), Z. Takács (90.) – Mohl (6.), Dvéri (17.), Andic (70.), B. Farkas (86.)

Nyíregyháza Spartacus: Lazareanu - Cornaci, Goia, Mboussi, Perényi - T. Hegedűs, Minczér (Ramos 67.), Miskolczi, Zabos (Bárányos 75.) - Apostu, Dosso (Shevel 65.). Coach: Attila Révész.
Debreceni VSC: Poleksic - Bernáth, Leandro, N. Mészáros, I. Szűcs, Z. Takács - Czvitkovics (P. Szakály 55.), Demjén (Dombi 72.), Z. Kiss - L. Oláh (Zs. Kerekes 63.), Rudolf. Coach: András Herczeg.
G.: Apostu (50.) – Leandro (28.)
Y.: Miskolczi (43.), Mboussi (45.), Minczér (53.), Goia (72.) – Bernáth (41.), Z. Takács (48.), I. Szűcs (54.)

Debreceni VSC: Poleksic - Bernáth, Leandro, N. Mészáros, I. Szűcs, Z. Takács - Czvitkovics (Dombi 57.), Z. Kiss, Z. Varga (P. Szakály 66.) - Zs. Kerekes, L. Oláh. Coach: András Herczeg.
Újpest FC: Balajcza - Dudic, Korcsmár, Lipták, Mijadinoski, Vaskó - Bozic (Jucemar 82.), Foxi (Rajczi 54.), Remili, Gy. Sándor - A. Simon. Coach: Lázár Szentes.
G.: L. Oláh (77.) – A. Simon (71.)
Y.: Zs. Kerekes (60.), I. Szűcs (63.)

BFC Siófok: Milinte - Gy. Hegedűs, Kerényi (Györök 32.) - Sz. Kanta (Basara 74.), R. Lipcsei, L. Nagy - Bojtor, Fülöp, Koós (M. Takács 69.), Magasföldi, Ndjodo. Coach: Ferenc Keszei.
Debreceni VSC: Poleksic - Bernáth, Bíró, Leandro (Z. Varga 84.), N. Mészáros, Z. Takács - Demjén, Z. Kiss, P. Szakály - L. Oláh (Zs. Kerekes 78.), Rudolf (Dudu 66.). Coach: András Herczeg.
G.: Leandro (4.), P. Bíró (33.), P. Szakály (51.), Rudolf (62.)
Y.: R. Lipcsei (59.), Basara (92.)

Debreceni VSC: Poleksic - Bernáth, Bíró, Leandro, N. Mészáros, Z. Takács - Demjén, Z. Kiss, P. Szakály (Z. Varga 46.; Dombi 69.) - L. Oláh, Rudolf (I. Szűcs 61.). Coach: András Herczeg.
Szombathelyi Haladás: Rózsa - Guzmics, Kuttor, Schimmer (Csontos 68.), P. Tóth - Kaj (Zs. Kovács 46.), B. Molnár, N. Sipos (A. Simon 80.), Vörös - Kenesei, Oross. Coach: Aurél Csertői.
G.: Rudolf (18.), L. Oláh (80.) – P. Tóth (59.), Z. Takács (86. - o.g.)
Y.: Rudolf (49.), N. Mészáros (53.), Leandro (90.+2) – Zs. Kovács (90.+2)
R.: Bíró (59.)

Debreceni VSC: Poleksic - Bernáth, Leandro, N. Mészáros, Szatmári (Dombi 54.), Z. Takács - Demjén (T. Sándor 75.), Z. Kiss, P. Szakály - L. Oláh, Rudolf (Dudu 46.). Coach: András Herczeg.
Vasas SC: G. Németh - Zs. Balog, Paripovic, Unierzyski - B. Tóth (Mundi 88.), Dobric (Gyánó 74.), N. Németh, Pavicevic, Somorjai (Piller 67.) - Divic, Lázok. Coach: Géza Mészöly.
G.: L. Oláh (60., 67.), Dudu (72.), P. Szakály (80.) – Dobric (26.)
Y.: Z. Takács (37.), Poleksic (54.) – Paripovic (21.), Pavicevic (45.), N. Németh (69.), Dobric (74.), Piller (86.)

Kecskeméti TE: Mitrovic - I. Farkas, Gyagya, Schindler - Cukic, Koncz, Némedi - Csordás (Alempijevic 74.), Á. Hegedűs (Menyhárt 60.), Montvai, Yannick (Rusvay 82.). Coach: Tomislav Sivic.
Debreceni VSC: Poleksic - Bernáth, Bíró (Kerekes 41.), Leandro, Komlósi, Z. Takács - Demjén, Z. Kiss, P. Szakály (Rudolf 64.) - Dudu (Dombi 46.), L. Oláh. Coach: András Herczeg.
G.: Montvai (15.), Yannick (44.), Csordás (68.)
Y.: Koncz (1.), Schindler (9.) – Leandro (52.), Komlósi (57.)

Debreceni VSC: Poleksic - Bernáth, Leandro, Komlósi, N. Mészáros, Z. Takács (T. Sándor 72.) - Dombi, Z. Kiss, P. Szakály (Czvitkovics 46.) - L. Oláh, Rudolf (Zs. Kerekes 67.). Coach: András Herczeg.
Rákospalotai EAC: Esterházy - Cseri (Pomper 46.), Kapcsos, Sallai - K. Erős, Jeremiás, Kőhalmi, B. Kovács, Lisztes (Balaskó 70.) - Nyerges, Torma (Dancs 57.). Coach: Zoltán Aczél.
G.: P. Szakály (7.), L. Oláh (36.), Rudolf (44. - pen.), Pomper (56. - o.g.), Z. Kiss (62.), Zs. Kerekes (90.+2) – Jeremiás (18., 64.)
Y.: Z. Takács (20.), Komlósi (81.) – K. Erős (29.), Cseri (43.)

Kaposvári Rákóczi FC: Z. Kovács - Kovácsevics, Petrók, Zahorecz - Bogdán (K. Graszl 83.), Grúz, Gujic, Nikolic (Jovánczai 71.), Obric, Pest (Z. Farkas 46.) - Bozovic. Coach: László Prukner.
Debreceni VSC: Poleksic - Bernáth, Leandro, Komlósi, Z. Takács - Demjén (Dombi 60.), Z. Kiss, P. Szakály (Czvitkovics 72.) - L. Oláh, Rudolf (T. Sándor 80.), J. Varga. Coach: András Herczeg.
G.: Rudolf (30.)
Y.: Grúz (21.), Bozovic (45.) – Z. Kiss (59.), Dombi (81.)

Debreceni VSC: Poleksic - Bernáth, Leandro, Komlósi (Z. Takács 39.), N. Mészáros - Demjén, Z. Kiss, P. Szakály (T. Sándor 86.) - L. Oláh, Rudolf, J. Varga (Dombi 70.). Coach: András Herczeg.
Budapest Honvéd FC: Rabóczki - Benjamin, Filó, Smiljanic, Z. Vincze - Dobos, Genito, Maróti, Stojakovic (Abass 72.) - Abraham (Moreira 46.), Hercegfalvi (Diego 78.). Coach: Gábor Pölöskei.
G.: Rudolf (2.), L. Oláh (41.), P. Szakály (58., 61.) – Moreira (59.)
Y.: Maróti (13.), Benjamin (25.), Genito (40.), Z. Vincze (75.)

MTK Budapest FC: Végh - Bajúsz, Lambulic, Á. Pintér, Rodenbücher - Gosztonyi (Lencse 59.), Kecskés, Melczer (Nikházi 77.), G. Nagy, Zsidai - Hrepka. Coach: József Garami.
Debreceni VSC: Poleksic - Bernáth, Leandro, Komlósi (N. Mészáros 72.), Z. Takács - Demjén, Z. Kiss, P. Szakály, J. Varga (Dombi 63.) - L. Oláh, Rudolf (Dudu 80.). Coach: András Herczeg.
G.: Z. Kiss (84.)
Y.: Zsidai (11.), Melczer (34.) – Z. Takács (45.), Leandro (76.)
R.: Rodenbücher (89.)

Debreceni VSC: Poleksic - Bernáth, Leandro, Komlósi, N. Mészáros - Demjén (Dombi 61.), Z. Kiss, P. Szakály - L. Oláh (Zs. Kerekes 66.), Rudolf, J. Varga (Czvitkovics 75.). Coach: András Herczeg.
Diósgyőri VTK: Vojinovic - Bokros, Gohér, V. Sebők - Ahodikpe, Búrány, Kamber, Szélpál (Lipusz 59.), P. Takács - V. Szabó (Homma 53.), M. Tóth (Tchana 85.). Coach: Tibor Sisa.
G.: Rudolf (32.) – P. Takács (64. - pen.), M. Tóth (70.)
Y.: Leandro (11.) – M. Tóth (13.)

Paksi SE: A. Kovács - Hanák (Csehi 36.), Pandur (Tamási 69.), Salamon - Baló, Böde, T. Heffler, T. Kiss, Sipeki - Tököli, Vári (Zováth 60.). Coach: Imre Gellei.
Debreceni VSC: Poleksic - Bernáth, Leandro, Komlósi, Z. Takács - Demjén, Z. Kiss, P. Szakály (Czvitkovics 75.) - L. Oláh (Dudu 61.), Rudolf, J. Varga (Dombi 87.). Coach: András Herczeg.
G.: Rudolf (20.), P. Szakály (39.)
Y.: Pandur (38.) – Komlósi (49.)

Spring

Zalaegerszegi TE: Vlaszák - Botis, P. Máté, Miljatovic, Szamosi (Alomerovic 59.), R. Varga - Hajdú (Zs. Balázs 76.), A. Horváth, Gy. Illés (D. Pavicevic 55.), Sluka - Waltner. Coach: János Csank.
Debreceni VSC: Poleksic - Bernáth, Leandro, Komlósi, N. Mészáros - Czvitkovics, Demjén (Katona 50.), P. Szakály (Vinicius 46.), J. Varga - Dudu, L. Oláh (Dombi 67.). Coach: András Herczeg.
G.: Gy. Illés (32.), D. Pavicevic (61.) – Dudu (39.)
Y.: Waltner (35.), Sluka (90.), Miljatovic (90.+3) – J. Varga (23.), Leandro (37.), Bernáth (77.), Dudu (90.+3)

Debreceni VSC: Poleksic - Bernáth, Leandro, Fodor, N. Mészáros - Czvitkovics, Katona, P. Szakály, J. Varga - L. Oláh (Dombi 46.), Rudolf. Coach: András Herczeg.
Győri ETO FC: Stevanovic - Stark, Supic, Stanisic, Völgyi - Bank (Dorogi 84.), Bicak (Sánta 84.), Böőr, Józsi - Aleksidze, Brnovic (Kink 46.). Coach: Dragoljub Bekvalac.
G.: Czvitkovics (7.), P. Szakály (72.) – Aleksidze (27.), Böőr (90.+1)
Y.: Czvitkovics (36.), Dombi (90.) – Józsi (52.), Bicak (56.), Supic (89.)
R.: Bernáth (36.)

FC Fehérvár: Zs. Sebők - Andic, G. Horváth, Mohl, Radovic (Koller 46.) - B. Farkas, Pavlicic (Vujovic 46.), Sifter (D. Szakály 75.) - Alves, D. Nagy, Sitku. Coach: István Varga.
Debreceni VSC: Poleksic - Bernáth, Bíró, Leandro, N. Mészáros - Czvitkovics (Cosic 83.), Demjén, Z. Kiss, J. Varga - L. Oláh (Rezes 90.), Rudolf (P. Szakály 32.). Coach: András Herczeg.
G.: Demjén (15.)
Y.: Radovic (36.), Sifter (73.), D. Nagy (74.) – Z. Kiss (56.)
R.: B. Farkas (75.), G. Horváth (90.+1)

Debreceni VSC: Poleksic (Pantic 82.) - Bernáth, Bíró, Leandro, N. Mészáros - Czvitkovics, Demjén (Dombi 72.), Z. Kiss, J. Varga - L. Oláh, Rudolf (Dudu 75.). Coach: András Herczeg.
Nyíregyháza Spartacus: Lazareanu - Cornaci, Imedashvili, Perényi - T. Hegedűs, Majoros (N. Szilágyi 62.), Minczér (Odrobéna 54.), Ramos, Zabos (Miskolczi 52.) - Apostu, Stojkov. Coach: András Szabó.
G.: Rudolf (13., 71.), L. Oláh (48.), Dudu (88.)
Y.: Czvitkovics (57.), Rudolf (70.) – Minczér (15.), Zabos (37.), Cornaci (55.), Stojkov (66.), T. Hegedűs (67.), Imedashvili (86.)

Újpest FC: Balajcza - Dudic, Korcsmár, Mijadinoski, Pollák - Bori (Foxi 74.), Bozic (Stokes 91.), Jucemar - Kabát, Rajczi (A. Simon 87.), Tisza. Coach: Lázár Szentes.
Debreceni VSC: Poleksic - Bernáth, Bíró (Komlósi 33.), Leandro, N. Mészáros - Czvitkovics, Demjén (P. Szakály 61.), Z. Kiss, J. Varga - L. Oláh (Dudu 58.), Rudolf. Coach: András Herczeg.
G.: Kabát (7.), Rajczi (58.)
Y.: Pollák (73.), Rajczi (75.), Foxi (78.) – Komlósi (51.)

Debreceni VSC: Poleksic - Bernáth, Leandro, Komlósi, N. Mészáros (Fodor 75.) - Czvitkovics, Demjén, Z. Kiss (J. Varga 59.), P. Szakály - Dudu (Vinicius 66.), L. Oláh. Coach: András Herczeg.
BFC Siófok: Milinte - Gy. Hegedűs, G. Horváth, Köntös, Sütő - Eugene (Roni 46.), Ivancsics (Basara 80.), Sz. Kanta, L. Nagy - Ekounda (Kogler 68.), Magasföldi. Coach: Zoltán Aczél.
G.: L. Oláh (16. - pen., 77.), N. Mészáros (37.), Dudu (44.), Vinicius (85.) – Magasföldi (43.)
Y.: Sz. Kanta (31.), Gy. Hegedűs (36.), Eugene (40.)
R.: Sütő (84.)

Szombathelyi Haladás: Rózsa - Csontos (Skriba 37.), Guzmics, Kuttor, Schimmer (Andorka 88.) - B. Molnár, Rajos, N. Sipos, Vörös - Kenesei, Oross. Coach: Aurél Csertői.
Debreceni VSC: Poleksic - Bernáth, Fodor, Komlósi, N. Mészáros - Czvitkovics, Dombi (Rezes 89.), Katona, J. Varga - L. Oláh (Dudu 46.), P. Szilágyi (Spitzmüller 84.). Coach: András Herczeg.
G.: Kenesei (60.) – Czvitkovics (32., 64. - pen.)
Y.: B. Molnár (83.) – Komlósi (75.)

Vasas SC: G. Németh - Zs. Balog, Unierzyski - Dobric, Laczkó, C. Pavicevic (Papucsek 60.), Villám (B. Tóth 46.), V. Vujovic, Vukelja (M. Katona 72.) - Orosz, Sowunmi. Coach: Géza Mészöly.
Debreceni VSC: Poleksic - Bernáth, Leandro, Fodor, N. Mészáros - Czvitkovics, Dombi (Rezes 63.), A. Katona, J. Varga - L. Oláh (P. Szilágyi 55.), Rudolf (P. Szakály 84.). Coach: András Herczeg.
G.: B. Tóth (54.) – Rudolf (16., 33.), P. Szilágyi (70.)
Y.: Laczkó (80.), Unierzyski (82.) – Bernáth (53.)

Debreceni VSC: Poleksic - Bernáth, Leandro, Fodor, N. Mészáros - Czvitkovics, A. Katona (P. Szakály 46.), Rezes (Dombi 56.), J. Varga - L. Oláh (Vinicius 65.), Rudolf. Coach: András Herczeg.
Kecskeméti: Mitrovic - Bagi, I. Farkas, Grkinic (A. Nagy 68.), Schindler - Csordás (Velimirovic 36.), Koncz, Némedi, Savic - Litsingi, Yannick (Menyhárt 80.). Coach: Tomislav Sivic.
G.: L. Oláh (22.), Leandro (73.), Dombi (86.) – Litsingi (36.)
Y.: Dombi (62.) – Litsingi (29.), Velimirovic (71.), Koncz (86.)
R.: Mitrovic (33.)

Rákospalotai EAC: Szántai - Dinka, Kapcsos (Dancs 67.), Z. Kovács, Pomper, Sallai - Csobánki (Z. Pintér 46.), K. Erős, Jeremiás, Rézmányi - Nyerges. Coach: Tamás Hevesi.
Debreceni VSC: Poleksic - Bernáth, Leandro, Fodor, N. Mészáros - Czvitkovics, A. Katona, P. Szakály (Rezes 58.; Dombi 75.), J. Varga - Rudolf (Dudu 64.), P. Szilágyi. Coach: András Herczeg.
G.: Czvitkovics (4.), Rudolf (19.), P. Szilágyi (55.), Leandro (59.)
Y.: K. Erős (58.) – Rezes (65.)

Debreceni VSC: Poleksic - Bernáth, Leandro, Fodor, N. Mészáros - Czvitkovics, A. Katona (Demjén 79.), P. Szakály (Dombi 70.), J. Varga - L. Oláh (P. Szilágyi 85.), Rudolf. Coach: András Herczeg.
Kaposvári Rákóczi FC: L. Horváth - Grúz, Zahorecz - Gujic (K. Graszl 32.), D. Hegedűs, Junior, Nikolic, Obric (Z. Farkas 72.), Pest - K. Farkas (Bozovic 58.), Zsolnai. Coach: László Prukner.
G.: Czvitkovics (17.), N. Mészáros (22.), P. Szakály (30.), Rudolf (70.) – Zsolnai (75.)

Budapest Honvéd FC: I. Tóth - Debreceni, Filó (Magoc 73.), Smiljanic, Á. Takács - Diego, Maróti, Vukmir - Abass (Moreira 69.), Abraham (Palásthy 81.), Hercegfalvi. Coach: Tibor Sisa.
Debreceni VSC: Poleksic - Leandro, Fodor, N. Mészáros, Z. Nagy - Czvitkovics (I. Szűcs 87.), A. Katona, P. Szakály (Demjén 83.), J. Varga - Rudolf, P. Szilágyi (Dombi 66.). Coach: András Herczeg.
G.: P. Szakály (59.)
Y.: Á. Takács (6.) – P. Szakály (55.), Rudolf (85.), Z. Nagy (90.)
R.: Maróti (90.+2)

Debreceni VSC: Poleksic - Leandro, Fodor, N. Mészáros, Z. Nagy - Czvitkovics (Vinicius 75.), A. Katona (Dombi 53.), P. Szakály, J. Varga - Rudolf, P. Szilágyi (Demjén 68.). Coach: András Herczeg.
MTK Budapest FC: Végh - Hidvégi, Lambulic, Rodenbücher, A. Szekeres - Eppel (Hrepka 63.), Melczer, G. Nagy, Pátkai, Zsidai - Könyves (Lencse 86.). Coach: József Garami.
G.: Leandro (57.), N. Mészáros (82.) – Pátkai (71.), A. Szekeres (90.+3)
Y.: J. Varga (84.), Vinicius (90.+2) – Könyves (17.), Rodenbücher (79.), Lambulic (81.), Hrepka (90.+2)

Diósgyőri VTK: Vojinovic - Bogunovic, Gohér, Viskovic - Ahodikpe (Lipusz 46.), Kamber, Lakatos, Lippai, P. Takács (Balajti 76.) - Homma, M. Tóth (V. Szabó 87.). Coach: György Gálhidi.
Debreceni VSC: Poleksic - Bernáth, Leandro, Komlósi, Mészáros - Czvitkovics, Vinicius (Fodor 73.), Z. Kiss, P. Szakály (Dombi 46.), J. Varga (A. Katona 85.) - Rudolf. Coach: András Herczeg.
G.: Homma (62.), Balajti (80.) – Czvitkovics (48., 52.), Dombi (70.)
Y.: Viskovic (19.), Ahodikpe (40.), Bogunovic (58.) – Vinicius (58.)

Debreceni VSC: Poleksic - Bernáth, Leandro, Komlósi - Czvitkovics, Dombi (Zs. Kerekes 74.), Z. Kiss, P. Szakály (J. Varga 66.) - L. Oláh (Vinicius 60.), Rudolf. Coach: András Herczeg.
Paksi SE: Csernyánszki - Éger, L. Horváth (Fiola 72.), A. Pintér - Böde, T. Heffler, T. Kiss, I. Nagy (Bohner 67.), Sipeki, Zováth (Tamási 50.) - Vári. Coach: Imre Gellei.
G.: Poleksic (45. - pen.), Rudolf (69. - pen.)
Y.: Zováth (24.), Böde (64.), Tamási (71.)

Hungarian Cup

Round 4

Algyő SK: Korom - Végh (J. Vass 78.), F. Varga, Retek, Kothencz - Krucsó, Gyimesi, L. Tóth (Daróczi 32.), Zakar - A. Tóth (Krajczár 55.), Pálinkó. Coach: Ákos Tóth.
Debreceni VSC: Csernyánszki - Z. Nagy, P. Bíró, I. Szűcs (Szarmári 46.), Z. Takács - Dombi, T. Sándor (Czvitkovics 58.), Huszák, Z. Varga - Zs. Kerekes (Bogdanovic 55.), Dudu. Coach: András Herczeg.
G.: Gyimesi (14.) – Zs. Kerekes (3., 13.), Dudu (6., 45., 55., 56.), Z. Varga (43.), Bogdanovic (61., 72., 85.)
Y.: Végh (5.), L. Tóth (12.), Krajczár (80.) – Z. Nagy (16.)

Round 5

First leg

FC Fehérvár: Zs. Sebők - Mohl, G. Horváth, Koller, Andic - Simek (T. Kulcsár 46.), B. Farkas, Sifter, Polonkai (Pavlicic 46.) - Sitku, Vujovic. Coach: István Varga.
Debreceni VSC: Csernyánszki - Z. Nagy, Komlósi, N. Mészáros, Z. Takács - Huszák, Demjén, Leandro, P. Szakály (Dombi 78.) - L. Oláh (Dudu 59.), Zs. Kerekes (Verpecz 22.). Coach: András Herczeg.
G.: Vujovic (62., 79.) – Leandro (65.)
Y.: Vujovic (47.) – Dombi (87.)
R.: G. Horváth (89.) – Csernyánszki (20.), Dudu (90.)

Second leg

Debreceni VSC: Poleksic - Bernáth, Komlósi, N. Mészáros, Leandro - Dombi, Z. Kiss, Demjén, Czvitkovics (T. Sándor 84.) - Bogdanovic (P. Szakály 72.), Zs. Kerekes (L. Oláh 63.). Coach: András Herczeg.
FC Fehérvár: Zs. Sebők - P. Lázár, Andic, Koller, Mohl - Polonkai (Dvéri 76.), B. Farkas, Sifter, Pavlicic (T. Kulcsár 46.) - Vujovic (D. Nagy 80.), Sitku. Coach: István Varga.
G.: Komlósi (39.)
Y.: Mohl (72.)
R.: Koller (90.+1)
FC Fehérvár 2–2 Debrecen on aggregate.  Debrecen won on away goals.

Quarterfinals

First leg

BFC Siófok: Szalma - Gy. Hegedűs, Sütő, Köntös (Bojtor 83.) - Tusori, Roni (Koós 55.), Andruskó, Sz. Kanta, Ivancsics - Magasföldi, Kogler (Ekounda 72.). Coach: Zoltán Aczél.
Debreceni VSC: Poleksic - Z. Nagy, N. Mészáros, Cosic, Hugo - Dombi (Czvitkovics 57.), Demjén, Huszák, P. Szakály (D. Nagy 81.) - Bogdanovic (L. Oláh 57.), Zs. Kerekes. Coach: András Herczeg.
G.: Magasföldi (20.), Ivancsics (57.)
Y.: Sz. Kanta (20.), Magasföldi (80.) – Hugo (31.), Huszák (43.)

Second leg

Debreceni VSC: Pantic - Z. Nagy, A. Katona, Leandro (Hugo 46.), Cosic - Dombi, Huszák, Czvitkovics (Demjén 46.), P. Szakály - Zs. Kerekes (Dudu 46.), Bogdanovic. Coach: András Herczeg.
BFC Siófok: Milinte - Tusori, Gy. Hegedűs, Sütő, G. Horváth - Kogler, L. Nagy, Sz. Kanta, Ivancsics (Basara 89.) - Magasföldi (Koós 77.), Ndjodo (Bojtor 68.). Coach: Zoltán Aczél.
G.: Dudu (49.) – Ivancsics (45. - pen.)
Y.: Huszák (6.), Leandro (36.) – Ndjodo (11.), Gy. Hegedűs (20.), Magasföldi (25.), Sütő (57.), Koós (88.)
Debrecen 1–3 Siófok on aggregate.

League Cup

Group stage

Diósgyőri VTK: Köteles - Bokros, B. Lakatos (Kreizler 81.), Kamber, Gohér - Szélpál (P. Takács 70.), Vranesevic, Á. Kovács (Kállai 76.), Sz. Horváth (Lipusz 57.) - Tchana (Pelecaci 12.), V. Szabó. Coach: Miklós Benczés.
Debreceni VSC: Csernyánszki - Z. Nagy, Kardos (Fodor 46.), Szatmári, Poledica - Czvitkovics (Bódi 46.), T. Sándor (Spitzmüller 71.), J. Varga, Z. Varga (Czanik 46.) - Zs. Kerekes (Eterovic 55.), Bogdanovic. Coach: András Herczeg.
G.: Tchana (5.), Szélpál (22.), Sz. Horváth (36.), V. Szabó (66.) – Zs. Kerekes (29.)
Y.: Poledica (43.)

Debreceni VSC: Csernyánszki - Z. Nagy (Bernáth 46.), Kardos, Z. Takács, Szatmári - Bódi, J. Varga, T. Sándor (Rezes 46.), Czvitkovics (Spitzmüller 78.) - Dudu (Bogdanovic 68.), Z. Varga (Zs. Kerekes 59.). Coach: András Herczeg.
Nyíregyháza Spartacus: Illyés - Zaleh, Ur, Nánási, K. Varga (Gy. Tóth 76.) - L. Lakatos (Orgován 64.), Belényesi (M. Farkas 68.), Odrobéna, Lippai (G. Simon 71.) - Dosso, Shevel (D. Puskás 80.). Coach: András Szabó.
G.: Z. Takács (7.), Dudu (16.) – Lippai (58.)
Y.: Shevel (32.), Zaleh (90.+3)

Vasas SC: Tulipán - Zs. Balog (Laczkó 46.), Villám, Papucsek, M. Katona - Merczel, Somorjai, Mundi, Piller (B. Tóth 75.) - Sowunmi, Gyánó. Coach: Géza Mészöly.
Debreceni VSC: Csernyánszki - Á. Németh, P. Máté, Fodor, Szatmári - Huszák (Czanik 65.), Spitzmüller (Lucas 81.), T. Sándor (P. Szilágyi 60.), Z. Varga (Urbin 80.) - Czvitkovics, Dudu. Coach: András Herczeg.
G.: Gyánó (44.), B. Tóth (76.) – P. Szilágyi (67.)
Y.: Laczkó (87.) – Á. Németh (18.), Dudu (40.), Spitzmüller (77.)

Debreceni VSC: Csernyánszki - Z. Nagy, P. Bíró (Kardos 46.), Z. Takács, Szatmári - R. Nagy (Ludánszki 68.), Lucas, Z. Varga, Czvitkovics (Vinicius 60.) - Dudu (Angyal 63.), Bogdanovic. Coach: András Herczeg.
Vác-Újbuda LTC: Sztankó (Várkonyi 79.) - T. Horváth (B. Juhász 79.), Laki, Tányéros, Cs. Hegedűs - G. Kocsis (D. Kocsis 46.), P. Farkas, Vén, Vidra (Krajcsek 70.) - Kövesdi, Rob (Hiebsch 63.). Coach: János Tóth.
G.: Czvitkovics (16.), Z. Takács (33.), Dudu (35.), Vinicius (67.)
Y.: Cs. Hegedűs (32.)

Bőcs KSC: Hamar - Kóka (Ondó 60.; Nyircsák 90.), Cséke, Martis, A. Török (Zs. Molnár 46.) - Jeney, Lipták (Vasas 81.), Irhás, L. Vass - J. Máté (Gaál 46.), George. Coach: Miklós Benczés.
Debreceni VSC: Csernyánszki - Á. Németh (Z. Nagy 46.), P. Bíró (Ludánszki 89.), Fodor, Szatmári - Czanik, Lucas, Z. Varga, Vinicius - P. Szilágyi (Urbin 72.), Bogdanovic. Coach: András Herczeg.
G.: L. Vass (68.), George (72.), Zs. Molnár (84.) – Bogdanovic (58., 65.)
Y.: A. Török (45.), Irhás (56.)

Debreceni VSC: Csernyánszki - Z. Nagy (Vinicius 46.), N. Mészáros, Z. Takács, Szatmári - Dombi, J. Varga (T. Sándor 67.), Z. Kiss, Czvitkovics - L. Oláh, Dudu (Bogdanovic 58.). Coach: András Herczeg.
Diósgyőri VTK: Vojinovic - Bokros, Viskovic, Milicic, Trbovic - Szélpál (Gahwagi 85.), Búrány, Kamber (Homma 42.), Pelecaci (Tchana 65.) - Lipusz (Gohér 58.), V. Szabó (Menyhért 80.). Coach: Tibor Sisa.
G.: —
Y.: J. Varga (10.), Z. Takács (52.) – Bokros (48.), Menyhért (90.+2)

Nyíregyháza Spartacus: Illyés - Perényi, Odrobéna, Goia, Cornaci - Miskolczi (B. Bakos 46.; Markos 74.), T. Hegedűs, Ramos, Lippai (L. Lakatos 58.) - Apostu (N. Szilágyi 28.), Dosso (G. Simon 73.). Coach: András Szabó.
Debreceni VSC: Verpecz - Bernáth (L. Oláh 70.), N. Mészáros, Z. Takács, Szatmári (Dombi 87.) - Demjén, Z. Kiss (Czanik 50.), A. Katona, Czvitkovics - Bogdanovic (T. Sándor 63.), Dudu (Z. Varga 89.). Coach: András Herczeg.
G.: Dosso (67.), Cornaci (83.) – Dudu (1.), Bogdanovic (13.)
Y.: Szatmári (29.), Z. Kiss (34.)

Debreceni VSC: Verpecz - Bernáth (Spitzmüller 78.), N. Mészáros, A. Katona, Fodor - Demjén, J. Varga (Korhut 46.), Z. Varga (Czanik 68.), Czvitkovics (Vinicius 68.) - Bogdanovic (L. Oláh 68.), Dudu. Coach: András Herczeg.
Vasas SC: Bartos (Tulipán 46.) - Villám, Papucsek, Kelemen (Cserpák 82.), A. Tóth - Somorjai, B. Tóth (Merczel 78.), Laczkó, Piller (B. Balogh 57.) - M. Katona (L. Szűcs 70.), Sowunmi. Coach: Géza Mészöly.
G.: Dudu (24., 60.), Bogdanovic (25.) – Papucsek (2.), Laczkó (17.), A. Tóth (65.)
Y.: Papucsek (56.)

Vác-Újbuda LTC: Sztankó - Tányéros, P. Kovács, Cs. Hegedűs, P. Farkas - Székesi (Vidra 77.), L. Fekete (Á. Varga 74.), Vén (Margitics 77.), Rusvay - Cs. Varga, Rob (D. Kocsis 60.). Coach: János Tóth.
Debreceni VSC: Póser - G. Oláh, Kardos, Lőrincz, Korhut - T. Nagy (Debreceni 61.), Lucas, Spitzmüller, Ferenczi - Faggyas, P. Szilágyi. Coach: András Herczeg.
G.: L. Fekete (25.), Rob (30.), Rusvay (65.) – Lucas (84.), Faggyas (89.)
Y.: Rusvay (69.), Margitics (80.), Sztankó (89.) – Kardos (30.), Lucas (73.)

Debreceni VSC: Verpecz - Z. Nagy, P. Bíró, I. Szűcs, Korhut (Fodor 46.) - R. Nagy, A. Katona, Huszák, P. Szakály (P. Szilágyi 71.) - Dudu, Vinicius. Coach: András Herczeg.
Bőcs KSC: Hamar - Martis, Ur (Póti 55.), Cséke, Zs. Molnár - Siróczki (George 79.), Irhás (Nyircsák 46.; Vasas 55.), Jeney, Szakszon (N. Horváth 65.) - Ondó, Bardi. Coach: László Tóth.
G.: Dudu (44., 65., 85., 90.), Vinicius (88.) – Martis (29.)
Y.: Cséke (35.), Ur (43.), Jeney (46.), Póti (71.), Martis (80.)

UEFA Cup

Qualifying rounds

First qualifying round

First leg

FC Shakhter Karagandy: Loria - Dordevic, Kornienko, Kislitsyn, Rusnac - Samchenko (Suyumagambetov 50.), Nozadze (Glushko 69.), Lovtchev, Ashirbekov (Kenetayev 83.) - Pacanda, Peric. Coach: Ivan Azovskiy.
Debreceni VSC: Csernyánszki - Bernáth, Komlósi, I. Szűcs, Z. Takács - Dombi (Huszák 46.), Z. Kiss, Leandro, Czvitkovics - Z. Varga (Zs. Kerekes 57.), Rudolf (Demjén 83.). Coach: András Herczeg.
G.: Peric (63.) – Rudolf (61.)
Y.: Dombi (10.), Szűcs (53.), Rudolf (64.)

Second leg

Debreceni VSC: Poleksic - Bernáth, N. Mészáros, Komlósi (I. Szűcs 21.), Z. Takács - Huszák (Dombi 68.), Z. Kiss, Leandro, Czvitkovics - Bogdanovic (Zs. Kerekes 46.), Rudolf. Coach: András Herczeg.
FC Shakhter Karagandy: Loria - Kislitsyn, Dordevic, Kornienko, Rusnac - Glushko, Kenetayev (Samchenko 46.), Lovtchev, Pacanda, Ashirbekov (Kozhushko 72.) - Peric. Coach: Ivan Azovskiy.
G.: Rudolf (38.)
Y.: Bernáth (2.), Huszák (38.), Z. Takács (74.) – Glushko (58.), Samchenko (62.), Peric (82.)
Debrecen 2–1 Karagandy on aggregate.

Second qualifying round

First leg

BFC Young Boys: Wölfli - Portillo, Ghezal, Schneider - Hochstrasser, Yapi, Raimondi (Lüscher 80.), Bastians - Varela, M. Schneuwly (Kulaksizoglu 84.), Eudi (Regazzoni 66.). Coach: Vladimir Petkovic.
Debreceni VSC: Poleksic - Bernáth, N. Mészáros, I. Szűcs, Z. Takács - Demjén, Z. Kiss, Leandro, Czvitkovics (P. Szakály 79.) - L. Oláh (Dudu 53.), Rudolf. Coach: András Herczeg.
G.: M. Schneuwly (41., 77.), Regazzoni (68., 87.) – Rudolf (17.)
Y.: Varela (76.) – Rudolf (67.)

Second leg

Debreceni VSC: Poleksic - Bernáth, N. Mészáros, P. Bíró, Z. Takács - Dombi, Z. Kiss, Leandro, Z. Varga (Dudu 61.) - L. Oláh (Eterovic 84.), Zs. Kerekes (Czvitkovics 66.). Coach: András Herczeg.
BSC Young Boys: Wölfli - Portillo, Ghezal, Schneider, Lüscher - Yapi, Hochstrasser (Kulaksızoğlu 64.), Raimondi (Bastians 71.) - M. Schneuwly (Varela 64.), Regazzoni, Doumbia. Coach: Vladimir Petkovic.
G.: L. Oláh (42.), Dudu (73.) – M. Schneuwly (33.), Regazzoni (56.), Yupi (67.)
Y.: Kulaksızoğlu (86.), Varela (87.)
Debrecen 3–7 Young Boys on aggregate.

References

External links
 Eufo
 UEFA
 Weltfussball
 fixtures and results

Debreceni VSC seasons
Debreceni Vsc